Mahmoud Ismail Hooda (2 April 1899 – 3 June 1964) was an Egyptian footballer who represented Egypt as a forward at both the 1924 and the 1928 Summer Olympics.

References

1899 births
1964 deaths
Egyptian footballers
Egypt international footballers
Association football forwards
Footballers at the 1924 Summer Olympics
Footballers at the 1928 Summer Olympics
Olympic footballers of Egypt